The Flying Matchmaker (also: Two Kuni Lemel, Shnei Kuni Leml or שני קוני למל) is a 1966 Israeli film musical directed by Israel Becker. The story is based on the 1880 Yiddish play Di tsvey Kuni-Lemels by Abraham Goldfaden. The film was the first major success on screen for lead actor Mike Burstyn who has a double role as Kuni Leml and his cousin Max, and also casts his father Pesach Burstein in a small role. The film was selected as the Israeli entry for the Best Foreign Language Film at the 39th Academy Awards, but was not accepted as a nominee.

Plot
The local matchmaker (shadchan), Reb Kalman arranges a match for Carolina, the daughter of a wealthy client, Reb Pinchas.  The daughter is already romantically linked with her teacher of French, Max. He arranges to show up in Kuni Lemel's place, disguised as Kuni Lemel, so he can marry Carolina.  Confusion ensues as both Max and Kuni Lemel show up to court Carolina.

Cast
 Mike Burstyn as Max / Kuni Leml
  as Matchmaker
  as Matchmaker's Daughter (as Jermain Unikovsky)
 Shmuel Rodensky as Rebbe Pinchas
  as Rebbe Pinchas' Wife
  as Carolina, Rebbe Pinchas's Daughter
 Aharon Meskin as Kuni Leml's Father
  as Max's Father

See also
 List of submissions to the 39th Academy Awards for Best Foreign Language Film
 List of Israeli submissions for the Academy Award for Best Foreign Language Film

References

External links 
 

1966 films
1966 musical films
1960s Hebrew-language films
Yiddish-language films
Films about twin brothers
Israeli musical films